(Jean Baptiste) Charles Dancla (19 December 1817 – 10 October 1907) was a French violinist, composer and teacher.

Biography
Dancla was born in Bagnères-de-Bigorre. When he was nine years old, violinist Pierre Rode in Bordeaux heard his music; he was so impressed that he sent a recommendation letter to Pierre Baillot, Luigi Cherubini and Rodolphe Kreutzer. Thus Dancla went to the Paris Conservatory and studied with Baillot for violin and Fromental Halévy for composition. He was strongly influenced by Niccolò Paganini, whom he heard in 1830, as well as by Henri Vieuxtemps. From 1835 onward Dancla was solo violinist in the Paris Opéra, and shortly thereafter he became concert master. In 1857 he was made a professor at the Paris Conservatory where he was a successful teacher for over 35 years. He died in Tunis.

His two brothers were Arnaud Dancla (1819–1862), cellist and author of a considerable cello teaching method, and Leopold Dancla (1822–1895), violinist and composer of chamber music.

Works

violin concertos 
string quartets 
string trios 
violin duos
Airs variés, Op. 89 for violin (each of the six airs are based on themes by different composers: Pacini, Rossini, Bellini, Donizetti, Weigl and Mercadante).
Airs variés, Op. 118 for violin (on themes from Montecchi e I Capuletti; La Straniera, Norma, La Sonnambula, Les Puritains, Le Carnaval de Venise).

See also
Dancla Stradivarius (1703)
Dancla Stradivarius (1708)
Dancla Stradivarius (1710)

References

External links
Charles Dancla: His life & times

Dancla's Op. 44 No. 4 piano trio Score and parts from Sibley Music Library Digital Scores Collection

1817 births
1907 deaths
19th-century classical composers
19th-century French male classical violinists
19th-century French composers
Academic staff of the Conservatoire de Paris
Conservatoire de Paris alumni
French male classical composers
French music educators
French Romantic composers
Prix de Rome for composition
Pupils of Anton Reicha